Transcendental Étude No. 10 in F minor, "Appassionata", is the tenth Transcendental Étude of a set of twelve by Franz Liszt. It is possibly the most played of the études and has a prominent melody.

Passage work for the left hand is rather difficult, while the right hand plays the melody mostly in octaves. There are several portions where the left and right hands alternate to play descending chords reminiscent of the third concert étude, Un Sospiro. Other difficulties include cramped spacing (the hands are often close together), left-hand arpeggiated passage work, complex figurations in polyrhythm, and the right hand ascending the keyboard in swiftness using only the thumb, the third, and fourth finger.

Musically, it is a study in pushing melodic lines to the razor's edge with passion and dramaticism while maintaining the melody. The climax occurs right after the softest part of the piece and is an octave D played 23 times in a row with rhythmic changes and rapid left-hand arpeggios that constantly change theme.

This is one of the more popular études of the set. It is in sonata form, with a second group in E minor, and an explosive coda. The 1837 version bears a coda which is modelled after the coda in the finale of Beethoven's "Appassionata" Sonata.

Moscow native and classical pianist, Evgeny Kissin, launched into the limelight in 1994 in Los Angeles performing his interpretation of Transcendental Étude No. 10 at Dorothy Chandler Pavilion. Kissin has continued to perform interpretations of Liszt's work throughout his career.

Diocesan College alumni, Liam Pitcher, won the Rustenberg Piano Festival in 2011 performing Transcendental Étude No. 10.

South Korean pianist and 2015 gold medal winner of the International Chopin Piano Competition, Seong-Jin Cho, performed Transcendental Étude No. 10 at the Walt Disney Concert Hall in October 2018 for his Los Angeles debut.

References

External links
 

Transcendental 10
1852 compositions
Compositions in F minor